The WSU Tag Team Championship is a professional wrestling tag team championship in Women Superstars United (WSU). It is competed for in Women Superstars United, and has been defended on shows of sister promotion National Wrestling Superstars. Championship reigns are determined by professional wrestling matches, in which competitors are involved in scripted rivalries. These narratives create feuds between the various competitors, which cast them as villains and heroines.

Title history

Combined reigns

By team

By wrestler

See also
Women Superstars United
WSU Championship
WSU Spirit Championship

References

External links
WSU Tag Team Championship
Women's professional wrestling tag team championships
Women Superstars Uncensored